Richmond Green Secondary School is a public secondary school in Richmond Hill, Ontario, Canada. The school is located on Leslie Street, just north of Elgin Mills Road. The school is managed by the York Region District School Board.

The school is a large, three-story building attached to the Richmond Green Public Library, which also serves as a school library. It is named after the adjacent Richmond Green park.

History
Despite officially opening as a high school in 2005, the building was built a year earlier and functioned as a temporary elementary school due to the nearby Lincoln Alexander Public School experiencing major construction setbacks. During the 2005/2006 school year, another York Region District School Board elementary school occupied the third floor due to an extensive asbestos cleanup occurring in their building. At this time, secondary school classes were restricted to the first and second floors.

Inauguration
Richmond Green had an enrollment of approximately 331 Grade 9 and 10 students and over 30 staff in its inaugural school year. Most of the Grade 10 students came from nearby Bayview Secondary School and Richmond Hill High School. In its second year, the number of students increased to 500 as Grade 11 courses were added. The 2007/2008 school year found the student population increased to 850 students, with Grade 12 being added. In May 2009, Richmond Green had approximately 1000 students, with new students arriving regularly due to new housing developments in Richmond Hill and Markham. As of October 2018, the population of the school is over 1,200.

Clubs
DECA Richmond Green Chapter, regional and provincial top finalists in business roleplay. (2015) DECA is currently not offered in the school anymore.
Badminton Team - YRAA finalists in female singles and mixed doubles game types (2015)
Cross Country Team - Individual YRAA Champion in Senior Boys division, Jeanue Chung (2021)
LEAD - Student Ambassadors with responsibilities in event planning
Jack.org RGSS Chapter - a national youth led initiative focused on mental health
Frostbite Esports - Nonprofit organization that is in charge of hosting gaming tournaments for high schools across North America
Student Activity Council - The Student Activity Council, also known as SAC, is where the grade representatives join together and plan events. You have to run a campaign and win to join
Green Team - The Green team are school helpers chosen and elected by teachers. They mainly help out during the grade 8 visit day and the first day of school.
Model United Nations - Club that educates students in critical thinking, world issues, diplomacy, leadership, and public speaking. Attends conferences across the GTA and Canada winning many awards. Also in 2019 hosted for the first time RGSSMUN, a homegrown conference for nearby schools.
HOSA - A club for students interested in becoming a future medical professional.

Please note that all clubs are not on this list

Notable alumni
Andrei Rogozine, gold medalist at the 2011 World Junior Figure Skating Championships.
Gabrielle Daleman, figure skating competitor at the 2014 Winter Olympics.
Denis Margalik, international figure skater and Argentine national champion.

See also
List of high schools in Ontario

References

External links
Richmond Green Joint Use School Project
Richmond Green High School

York Region District School Board
High schools in the Regional Municipality of York
Education in Richmond Hill, Ontario
2005 establishments in Ontario